William Standish Knowles (June 1, 1917 – June 13, 2012) was an American chemist. He was born in Taunton, Massachusetts.  Knowles was one of the recipients of the 2001 Nobel Prize in Chemistry.  He split half the prize with Ryōji Noyori for their work in asymmetric synthesis, specifically for his work in hydrogenation reactions.  The other half was awarded to K. Barry Sharpless for his work in oxidation reactions.

Education
Knowles attended Berkshire School in Sheffield, Massachusetts. He led his class academically and upon graduation was admitted to Harvard University after passing the College Board exams. Feeling that he was too young to go to college, Knowles spent a year at Phillips Academy in Andover, Massachusetts. At the end of the year, he captured his first award in chemistry, the school's $50 Boylston Prize.

After his year in preparatory school, Knowles attended Harvard, where he majored in chemistry, focusing on organic chemistry.  He received his undergraduate degree in 1939, and attended Columbia University for graduate school.

Awards and honors
1983 Chemical Pioneer Award from the American Institute of Chemists
2001 Nobel Prize in Chemistry 
2008 Peter H. Raven Lifetime Achievement Award, from the Academy of Science, St. Louis.

Nobel Prize
He shared half of the Nobel Prize in Chemistry in 2001 with Ryōji Noyori for "their work on chirally catalysed hydrogenation reactions". The other half of the prize was awarded to K. Barry Sharpless for the development of a range of catalytic asymmetric oxidations. Knowles developed one of the first asymmetric hydrogenation catalysts by replacing the achiral triphenylphosphine ligands in Wilkinson's catalyst with chiral phosphine ligands. This experimental catalyst was effective for enantioselective synthesis, achieving a modest 15% enantiomeric excess.

Knowles was also the first to apply enantioselective metal catalysis to industrial-scale synthesis; while working for the Monsanto Company he developed an enantioselective hydrogenation step for the production of L-DOPA, utilising the DIPAMP ligand.

Personal life
Following his retirement in 1986, Knowles resided in Chesterfield, Missouri, a suburb of St. Louis. In retirement he restored native prairie grasses on a 100-acre farm that his wife had inherited. He was married to his wife, Nancy, for 66 years and had four children, Elizabeth, Peter, Sarah and Lesley. He also had four grandchildren. Knowles died in Chesterfield on June 13, 2012 at age 95. He and his wife had previously stated that their farm would be donated to be converted into a city park after their deaths.

References

External links
  including the Nobel Lecture December 8, 2001 Asymmetric Hydrogenations
 Knowles's  Nobel Lecture Asymmetric Hydrogenations
 
 

American chemists
American Nobel laureates
Columbia University alumni
Harvard University alumni
Berkshire School alumni
Nobel laureates in Chemistry
People from Taunton, Massachusetts
1917 births
2012 deaths
Members of the United States National Academy of Sciences
Monsanto employees
Chemists from Missouri
Nobel laureates affiliated with Missouri